The lieutenant governor of Missouri is the first person in the order of succession of the U.S. state of Missouri's executive branch, thus serving as governor in the event of the death, resignation, removal, impeachment, absence from the state, or incapacity due to illness of the governor of Missouri. The lieutenant governor also serves, ex officio, as president of the Missouri Senate. The lieutenant governor is elected separately from the governor, and therefore may be of a different party than the governor.

The current lieutenant governor is Mike Kehoe.

List

Notes 

 A.  The fractional terms of some lieutenant governors are not to be understood absolutely literally; rather, they are meant to show single terms during which multiple lieutenant governors served, due to resignations, deaths and the like.
 B.  Resigned from office.
 C.  Vacant due to resignation of lieutenant governor.
 D.  Vacant due to lieutenant governor becoming governor for remainder of unexpired term.
 E.  Died in office.
 F.  Vacant due to death of lieutenant governor.
 G.  Vacant due to lieutenant governor acting as governor.
 H.  The Missouri state convention declared the executive department of the state had expatriated itself and their offices vacant. Reynolds had fled the capital and aligned himself with the Confederacy.
 I.  Hall was elected the provisional governor of Missouri by the state convention.
 J.  Appointed lieutenant governor following the resignation of Lee.
 K.  Resigned from office to take an appointed seat in the United States Senate.
 L.  Wilson appointed lieutenant governor-elect Maxwell to fill vacancy until his official inauguration.

References 
General
 
 

Constitutions
 
 
 Constitution of Missouri—1820
 Constitution of Missouri—1865
 Constitution of Missouri—1875

Specific

External links 
 Office website of the Lieutenant Governor of Missouri
Publications by or about the Office of the Lieutenant Governor of Missouri at Internet Archive.

 
Missouri
Lieut